Heterotheridion is a monotypic genus of comb-footed spiders with a palearctic distribution, containing the single species, Heterotheridion nigrovariegatum. It was first described by J. Wunderlich in 2008.

See also
 List of Theridiidae species

References

Monotypic Araneomorphae genera
Palearctic spiders
Theridiidae